104P/Kowal, also known as Kowal 2, is a periodic Jupiter-family comet discovered by Charles T. Kowal in 1979. The orbit was confirmed after new sightings in 1991 and 1998.

In 2003, Gary Kronk and Brian Marsden noticed that an object observed by Leo Boethin in 1973 was actually 104P/Kowal. From Boethin's report, it was apparent that comet Kowal 2 had been in a short, major outburst to apparent magnitude 9.5 in 1973.

References
 

Periodic comets
104P
0104
Discoveries by Charles T. Kowal
Comets in 2016
19790113